(born 19 November 1945) is a retired Japanese long-distance runner who won a silver medal in the marathon at the 1970 Asian Games. He also won the Lake Biwa Marathon (1966 and 1967), Enschede Marathon (1967), Sapporo Half Marathon (1970) and Beppu-Ōita Marathon (1972).

References

Living people
1945 births
Place of birth missing (living people)
Japanese male long-distance runners
Japanese male marathon runners
Asian Games silver medalists for Japan
Asian Games medalists in athletics (track and field)
Athletes (track and field) at the 1970 Asian Games
Medalists at the 1970 Asian Games
Japan Championships in Athletics winners
20th-century Japanese people